This is a list of Singapore soccer transfers for the 2022 Singapore Premier League.

Transfers 

All players without a flag are Singaporean.  All clubs without a flag are Singapore based club.

Albirex Niigata (S)

In:

Out:

 

 

Retained:

Balestier Khalsa

In:

 

 
 

 
 
 
 
 
 
 

Out:

 
 

Retained:

Note 1: Kimura Riki was transferred permanently to Balestier Khalsa after a successful 2021 season

Geylang International

In:

 
 
 
 
 
 
 
 
 
 

Out:

 
 
 

 
 
  

Retained:

Note 1: Danish Irfan was released after returning from loan before moving to Tampines Rovers.

Hougang United

In:

 
 
 
 

Out:

 
 
 

 
 

Retained:

Lion City Sailors

In:

 
 
 

 
 
 
 
 
 
 
 

 

Out:

 
 

 
 
 
 

Retained:

Note 1: Kimura Riki was transferred to Balestier Khalsa after a successful 2021 season

Note 2: Ho Wai Loon & Faizal Roslan were released after their loan with Balestier and Geylang.  Ho Wai Loon returned to Balestier on free transfer.  Faizal Roslan returned to Geylang on free transfer. 

Note 3: Rudy Khairullah signed a new contract before being loaned to Balestier Khalsa for the 2022 season.

Tampines Rovers

In:

 
 
 

Out:

 
 
 
 
 
 
 
 

Retained:

Tanjong Pagar United

In:

 
 

 
 

Out:

 
 
 
 
 
 
 
 
 
 
 
 

Retained:

Young Lions FC

In:

 
 
 
 
 

Out:

 
 
 
 
 
 
 

Retained:

References

External links
Singapore Premier League website

Football transfers winter 2020–21
Football transfers summer 2021
2022 in Singaporean football
2022